Johann Jakob Stehlin (20 January 1803 – 18 December 1879) was a Swiss politician of the Free Democratic Party.

Born in Basel, Stehlin was mayor of that city from 1858 to 1868. He also represented the canton Basel-City in the National Council, which he presided over in 1858/59 and 1867/68, and in the Council of States.

On 11 July 1855, Stehlin was elected to the Swiss Federal Council to succeed the deceased Josef Munzinger. The next day, he declined the election, becoming the first of five Councillor-elects (as of 2020) to do so. Josef Martin Knüsel was elected in his place on 14 July.

Two of Stehlin's sons also acquired renown: Karl Rudolf Stehlin, also a member of the Council of States, and Johann Jakob Stehlin junior, a noted architect.

References 
 
 
 

1803 births
1879 deaths
Politicians from Basel-Stadt
Swiss Calvinist and Reformed Christians
Free Democratic Party of Switzerland politicians
Members of the Council of States (Switzerland)
Members of the National Council (Switzerland)
Presidents of the National Council (Switzerland)
Mayors of places in Switzerland
19th-century Swiss politicians